The 1992–93 season of the División de Honor de Futsal was the 4th season of top-tier futsal in Spain. It was played in two rounds. At first round teams were divided in three groups of 8 teams every one, advancing four first to second round for title. Four last advanced to second round for permanence.

Regular season

1st round

Group A

Group B

Group C

2nd round

Title – Group Par

Title – Group Impar

Permanence – Group Par

Permanence – Group Impar

Playoffs

See also
División de Honor de Futsal
Futsal in Spain

External links
1992–93 season at lnfs.es

1992 93
Spain
futsal